Diana Hoyos (born Diana Patricia Hoyos Buenaventura; 22 April 1985) is a Colombian actress and singer, known for her starring role in the Caracol Televisión telenovela Oye bonita. She is also known in her native country for other productions such as Amar y temer, El Chivo, and Sinú, río de pasiones.

Filmography

Film roles

Television roles

References

External links 
 

Living people
Colombian telenovela actresses
Colombian film actresses
21st-century Colombian actresses
1985 births